Tsuneyuki is a masculine Japanese given name.

Possible writings
Tsuneyuki can be written using different combinations of kanji characters. Here are some examples:

常行, "usual, go"
常之, "usual, of"
常幸, "usual, happiness"
常恭, "usual, respectful"
恒行, "always, go"
恒之, "always, of"
恒幸, "always, happiness"
恒雪, "always, snow"
庸行, "common, go"
庸之, "common, of"
庸幸, "common, happiness"
毎行, "every, go"
毎之, "every, of"
毎幸, "every, happiness"

The name can also be written in hiragana つねゆき or katakana ツネユキ.

Notable people with the name
, 18th-century Japanese artist.
, Japanese golfer.
, Japanese footballer.
Tsuneyuki Yamamoto (山本 庸幸, born 1949), Japanese trade bureaucrat. Former Supreme Court Judge.

Japanese masculine given names